Džemal Bijedić (12 April 1917 – 18 January 1977) was a Bosnian and Yugoslav politician. He served as the Prime Minister of Yugoslavia from 30 July 1971 until his death in a plane crash on 18 January 1977.

Biography
Džemal Bijedić was born on 12 April 1917 in Mostar, Bosnia and Herzegovina (then part of Austria-Hungary) to Adem and Zarifa from the prominent Bosniak merchant family of Bajramaga Bijedic, who had moved from Gacko to Mostar in 1915. Džemal was barely one year old when his father Adem died of Spanish flu in 1919; his mother Zafira and uncle Becir took care of the family in the 1920s.

Džemal Bijedić finished his elementary and secondary education in Mostar, and graduated from the University of Belgrade Faculty of Law, where he joined the League of Communists of Yugoslavia in 1939. He became a member of SKOJ in October 1939 and a member of the Mostar branch of the League of Communists just two months later. Due to his political sympathies, he was three times detained when in Mostar.

In a documentary produced by Face TV, Mišo Marić claims that Bijedić joined the  Domobranci (anti-communist militia) in April 1941, following the directives of League of Communists of Yugoslavia, as a lieutenant with the alias of Ante Jukić. Another documentary about Džemal Bijedić produced by Federalna televizija shows (at 15:34) a photo of Bijedić dressed in a military uniform with Domobranci collar insignia. The same photo was shown at the beginning of the first documentary (01:27), but the Domobranci insignia was painted over with Partisans' red star in colour. It is also mentioned that Bijedić joined the Yugoslav Partisans in February 1943.

After the liberation, Bijedić had many political roles, including as Assistant Minister of Internal Affairs in the government of the socialist republic of Bosnia and Herzegovina. Bijedić played a key role in the affirmation of the Muslims as a Yugoslav constitutive nation.

Significant progress in the economy of Herzegovina was made under Bijedić's leadership, with the establishment of heavy industry such as the Aluminijum Kombinat, and the modernization of the Sarajevo–Ploče railway.

Bijedić served as Chairman of the People's Assembly of the Socialist Republic of Bosnia and Herzegovina from 1967 to 1971  and as President of the Federal Executive Council of the Socialist Federative Republic of Yugoslavia from 1971 to his death in 1977 - i.e. Prime Minister of Yugoslavia.

On 18 January 1977, Džemal Bijedić, his wife Razija (born Ferhatbegović), and six others were killed when their Learjet 25 crashed on the Inač mountain near Kreševo, Bosnia and Herzegovina. The plane took off from Batajnica Air Base in Belgrade and was en route to Sarajevo when it crashed, ostensibly due to poor weather conditions. Conspiracy theorists have suggested that the crash was not an accident but rather the result of foul play at the hands of his rivals, as he was considered as a potential successor to old and ailing Tito. Bijedić and his wife were survived by their two sons and one daughter.

The university in Mostar was renamed Džemal Bijedić University in his honour. His birthplace was also turned into a museum. An exhibition about Džemal Bijedić was held in Mostar in 2016.

References
Citations

Bibliography

External links

Toasts of the President Geral Ford and Prime Minister Dzemal Bijedic of Yugoslavia, 19 March 1975

 

1917 births
1977 deaths
Politicians from Mostar
University of Belgrade Faculty of Law alumni
Bosniaks of Bosnia and Herzegovina
Bosnia and Herzegovina atheists
Bosnia and Herzegovina communists
Bosnia and Herzegovina former Muslims
Bosnia and Herzegovina people of World War II
League of Communists of Bosnia and Herzegovina politicians
Presidents of the Federal Executive Council of Yugoslavia
State leaders killed in aviation accidents or incidents
Victims of aviation accidents or incidents in 1977
Victims of aviation accidents or incidents in Bosnia and Herzegovina
Victims of aviation accidents or incidents in Yugoslavia
Yugoslav communists
Chairmen of the Presidency of Bosnia and Herzegovina
Recipients of the Order of the Hero of Socialist Labour